Dita may refer to:

People 
 Dita Charanzová (born 1975), Czech politician and diplomat
 Dita Jeřábková (born 1974), Czech former volleyball player
 Dita Hopkins Kinney (1855—1921), first superintendent of the United States Army Nurse Corps
 Dita Karang (born 1996), Indonesian member of the South Korean girl group Secret Number
 Dita Krūmberga (born 1984), Latvian former basketball player
 Dita Parlo (1908-1971), German actress
 Dita Rozenberga (born 1992), Latvian basketball player
 Dita Indah Sari (born 1972), Indonesian trade union and socialist activist
 Dita Želvienė (born 1968), Lithuanian former swimmer and coach
 Bruno Dita (born 1993), Albanian footballer
 Constantina Diță (born 1970), Romanian Olympic marathon champion
 Nicolae Diță (born 1976), Romanian former footballer
 Dita Von Teese, stage name of American burlesque performer Heather Renée Sweet (born 1972)
 Mey Chan (born 1986), Indonesian singer known as Dita

Arts and entertainment
 Dita (TV series), an Australian talk show from 1967 to 1970
 Dita Galindo, a fictional character in the FX television series Mayans M.C.
 Dita, a character in the manga and anime series Chobits

Other uses
 Dita (moth), a genus of moths in the family Oecophoridae
 Dita (woreda), a district of Ethiopia
 Dita, an Ethiopian lyre-like musical instrument
 Darwin Information Typing Architecture (DITA), an XML data model for content authoring and publishing

Feminine given names